Moon is the third full-length studio album released by Japanese solo artist Gackt on June 19, 2002. Instead of a booklet, the album comes with a printed note by the artist, asking readers to "sense" the record's story, rather than analyzing the lyrics. The booklet was eventually included in the packaging of Moon'''s 2003 follow-up Crescent. Both albums are conceptually linked, as well as his more recent albums Diabolos and Last Moon from the "Moon Saga".

Release
The album was released on 19 June 2002, by Nippon Crown. In the initial counting week of July it reached number two on the 
Oricon charts, with sales of 185,840 copies. It charted for 10 weeks. In 2002, with sales of 281,590 copies, was the 67th best selling album of the year. As since its release the album has sold more than 250,000 copies, was certified Gold by the RIAJ.

The first single "Another World" became Gackt's first to reach the top two on the charts. The single reached number two on the third counting week of September 2001, with sales of 111,560 copies. In the upcoming weeks, it was at number three and eight respectively, with sales of 42,490, and 22,850 copies. It charted for 17 weeks, of that eight in the top twenty. In 2001, with 255,640 copies sold, it was the 74th best-selling single of the year, and it sold over 284,550 copies, most of any of his singles, and it is the only second (and latest) to sell over two hundred thousand copies.

The second single "Wasurenai Kara" reached number four on the initial counting week of May 2002, with sales of 78,310 copies. It charted for 5 weeks. In 2002, with 132,260 copies sold, was the 98th best selling single of the year.

Critical receptionMoon was generally positively received by reviews. Allmusic author Alexey Eremenko gave the album a rating of 3.5 out of 5 stars, observing that "is a fine specimen of its kind", it's "fast, emotive, heavy but not scary", praising the slow-tempo somber song "Fragrance", but criticized the album because is "too fine and effective" it becomes "sterile", and "sounds too much like music in general". He concluded that "despite the few musical connotations it actually possesses", as "far as artificial (read: professional) Japanese music goes, Moon is definitely one monster of a record".

Track listing

Notes
 The song "Lu:na" was used as an opening theme in the anime New Fist of the North Star, for which Gackt provided the voice of the main antagonist Seiji.
 The song "Another World" was used in the Neue Men's commercial for Shiseido.
 The song "Doomsday" was used in a Takano Yuri commercial.
 The song "Speed Master" was covered in partly English version by Gackt's band Yellow Fried Chickenz's and performed live including at Makuhari Messe in 2011, released on DVD recording World Tour *Show Ur Soul.I* 世壊傷結愛魂祭 at Makuhari 2011'' in 2012.

Album credits 

 Personnel
Vocals, Piano: Gackt 
Guitar, Violin: You
Guitar: Yukihiro "Chachamaru" Fujimura
Guitar: Masa 
Effects, Guitar: Nao Kimura 
Bass: Ren
Drums: Toshiyuki Sugino
Drums: Ryuichi Nishida
Bass: Crazy Cool Joe
Bass: Koichi Terasawa
Bass: Yoshihito Onda
Drums: Kota Igarashi
Violin: Gen Ittetsu
Keyboards & Orchestra arrangement: Shusei Tsukamoto

 Production
Producer: Gackt
Associate Produced: Yukihiro “chachamaru” Fujimura
Executive Producer: Masami Kudo (Nippon Crown), You Harada (Museum Museum)
Recorded & Mixed & Pro Tools Edited: Motonari Matsumoto
Assistant Engineer: Yoshitaka Ishigaki (Burnish), Michinori Sato (Burnish), Takanobu Suhiyama (Burnish), Chie Miyasaka (Burnish), Tadashi Yamaguchi (Studio Jive), Shinichi Tokumo (Sound Atelier), Teruaki Ise (Wonder station)
Recording Coordinator: Maki Iida, Yoshihito Umeki (Burnish)
Mastering Engineer: Yoichi Aikawa (Rolling Sound Mastering Stuio)

 Design
Art direction, Design, Gun Coordinator: Jun Misaki
Photographer: Kenji Tsukagoshi

References

2002 albums
Gackt albums